Cladomelea debeeri is a species of spider in the orb-weaver spider family Araneidae, found in South Africa. It was first described in 2004.  Cladomelea species, including C. debeeri, are "bolas spiders" – adult females capture their prey by using one or more sticky drops on the end of a line which they swing, usually catching male moths attracted by the release of an analogue of the attractant sex pheromone produced by the female moth. Juvenile and adult male bolas spiders do not use a bolas, catching prey with their legs alone.

Description
The first described female had a total length of 15.8 mm, with a carapace length of 3.8 mm and an abdomen length of 12.6 mm – the abdomen partly covered the carapace. The carapace was slightly wider than long, with a maximum width of 3.9 mm. The carapace was yellowish brown with a complex dark brown pattern and covered with long white wool-like setae. The head region had four tubercules: a short one at the front, then a longer one, and then a pair of shorter ones. The eyes were arranged in two slightly recurved rows. The sternum was cream coloured. The abdomen was creamish yellow, shaped like a backward pointing triangle with five tubercules at each front corner and six at the back. Each tubercule had a darker tip and a tuft of long white setae. The first leg was longest, 14.7 mmm. The spider's legs were creamish white with dark spiral-shaped bands on the femora, patellae and tibiae and longitudinal bands on the metatarsi. The epigyne had no scape, only a small rounded lip. The male was unknown.

Taxonomy
Cladomelea debeeri was first described by John Roff and Ansie Dippenaar-Schoeman in 2004. Cladomelea species are bolas spiders, and although the genus was not included in two relevant molecular phylogenetic studies in 2014 and 2020, would be expected to be part of the "mastophorines", placed in the subfamily Cyrtarachninae s.l.

Bolas construction and use
A female was observed over four successive nights. It constructed its bolas in early evening. This was made up of two or three increasingly shorter silk threads each ending in a sticky droplet about 2–3 mm in diameter. When the threads were put together, the result was one compound thread with two or three droplets. (This differs from the bolas of the other South African bolas spider,  C. akermani, which uses only a single thread with one or two droplets.) The bolas was whirled with the second pair of legs. A new bolas was constructed every 2–3 hours. The spider was observed to catch a moth only on the first night.

References

Endemic fauna of South Africa
Araneidae
Spiders of South Africa
Spiders described in 2004